Radial Road 5, more commonly referred to as R-5, is a network of roads and bridges that all together form the fifth radial road of Manila in the Philippines. The road links the City of Manila with Mandaluyong and Pasig in the east, leading out of Metro Manila into the province of Rizal and south towards Laguna. It is the only arterial road traversing the east side of Laguna de Bay.

Route
The road consists of the following segments:

Victorino Mapa Street

R-5 begins as Victorino Mapa Street in Santa Mesa, Manila from the intersection with Magsaysay Boulevard to where it connects to P. Sanchez Street at a junction with Victorino Mapa Street Extension. It is the main north-south road of Santa Mesa.

P. Sanchez Street
R-5 is known as P. Sanchez Street along the rest of the route in Santa Mesa. Named after Francisco de Paula Sanchez, a Jesuit priest from the Ateneo Municipal de Manila, it links Santa Mesa to Mandaluyong east of the San Juan River.

Shaw Boulevard

The main segment of R-5 in Mandaluyong and Pasig is known as Shaw Boulevard. Padre Sanchez Street merges with Shaw Boulevard at the intersection with General Kalentong Street. It travels east-southeast near the border with San Juan and passes through the Wack Wack Golf and Country Club before arriving at the intersection with Epifanio de los Santos Avenue (C-4). East of EDSA, R-5 forms the southern boundary of the Ortigas Center business district and quickly enters the city of Pasig after crossing San Miguel Avenue. It passes through the Capitol Commons development at the former Rizal Provincial Capitol complex before turning south on Pasig Boulevard at the junction with Hillcrest Drive in Bagong Ilog, Pasig.

Pasig Boulevard
Between Shaw Boulevard and Eulogio Rodriguez Jr. Avenue (C-5), R-5 is known as Pasig Boulevard. It marks the boundary between barangays Kapitolyo and Bagong Ilog running north-south towards the Pasig River before turning east towards C-5 by the Rizal Medical Center.

Ortigas Avenue

The area of the old city proper of Pasig (Malinao, etc.) east of Bagong Ilog from Pasig Boulevard has a short and narrow street layout. Hence, R-5 follows C-5 northbound and continues its eastward route instead along Ortigas Avenue towards Rizal. From Rosario, Pasig, R-5 passes through the municipalities of Cainta and Taytay turning south on Taytay Diversion Road at the Tikling Junction.

Taytay Diversion Road
Between Ortigas Avenue Extension and the Manila East Road, R-5 is known as the Taytay Diversion Road. It runs north-south traversing the Taytay poblacion of Dolores where SM City Taytay is located.

Manila East Road

R-5 in the rest of southern Rizal and eastern Laguna province is known as the Manila East Road. It travels east-southeast mostly along the shore of Laguna de Bay from Angono to Pililla. It crosses the Sierra Madre border between Rizal and Laguna and continues along the lakeshore from Mabitac south towards Pagsanjan.

See also
 List of roads in Metro Manila

References

Routes in Metro Manila